Darreh Shur (also Romanized as Darreh Shūr; also known as Shahīd Sheykhī-ye Darreh Shūr) is a village in Haparu Rural District, in the Central District of Bagh-e Malek County, Khuzestan Province, Iran. At the 2006 census, its population was 195, in 34 families.

References 

Populated places in Bagh-e Malek County